Katie Kobak Stuart is a Democratic member of the Illinois House of Representatives from the 112th district. The 112th district, located in the Metro East, includes all or parts of Bethalto, Caseyville, Collinsville, Edwardsville, Fairmont City, Fairview Heights, Glen Carbon, Granite City, Madison, Maryville, O'Fallon, Pontoon Beach, Roxana, Shiloh, Swansea, and Wood River. Stuart, an Edwardsville resident, taught math at Southern Illinois University Edwardsville prior to taking office in the Illinois House of Representatives.

As of July 3, 2022, Stuart is a member of the following Illinois House committees:

 Appropriations - Higher Education Committee (HAPI)
 Election Administration & Ballot Access Subcommittee (SHEE-ELEC)
 Elementary & Secondary Education: School Curriculum & Policies Committee (HELM)
 Ethics & Elections Committee (SHEE) *Vice Chair*
 Firefighters and Fight Responders Subcommittee (SHPF-FIRE)
 Higher Education Committee (HHED) *Chair* 
 Mental Health & Addiction Committee (HMEH)
 Police & Fire Committee (SHPF)

Electoral history

References

External links

Living people
People from Edwardsville, Illinois
Rutgers University alumni
Southern Illinois University Edwardsville alumni
Democratic Party members of the Illinois House of Representatives
Women state legislators in Illinois
Southern Illinois University Edwardsville faculty
21st-century American politicians
21st-century American women politicians
1970 births